Corey Bojorquez (born September 13, 1996) is an American football punter for the Cleveland Browns of the National Football League (NFL). He played college football at Cerritos College before transferring to New Mexico, and signed with the New England Patriots as an undrafted free agent in 2018. He has also played for the Buffalo Bills, Los Angeles Rams, and Green Bay Packers.

Early years
Bojorquez attended and played high school football at Mayfair High School in Lakewood, California.

College career
Bojorquez verbally committed to play college football at Sacramento State, but changed his mind at the last minute, opting to play at Cerritos College, a junior college known for producing dozens of professional players, to improve his prospects of making it to an FBS program. After Bojoroquez received offers from Indiana State University, an FCS school, and Concordia University, a member of the RSEQ Conference in Canada, he decided to accept an offer to transfer to the University of New Mexico. He handled punting duties in the 2016 and 2017 seasons. In 2017, he was named a 3rd Team All-American Punter by GPR Punt Rating.

Collegiate statistics

Professional career

New England Patriots
Bojorquez signed with the New England Patriots as an undrafted free agent on May 14, 2018. He was waived on September 1, 2018. Bojoroquez was one of the final preseason cuts by New England as the team opted to keep incumbent punter Ryan Allen, but was intended to be signed to their practice squad. He never played a snap during the preseason, only practicing some punts during the intermission of the last preseason game with the Patriots.

Buffalo Bills
On September 2, 2018, Bojorquez was claimed off waivers by the Buffalo Bills, and was named the starting punter after the team released Colton Schmidt. He made his NFL debut in the Bills' season opener against the Baltimore Ravens. In the 47–3 loss, he had eight punts for 397 net yards for a 49.6 average. Bojorquez sustained a shoulder injury during the October 7 game against the Tennessee Titans; after playing three games with the injured shoulder, he was placed on injured reserve on October 31, ending his season. Overall, he finished his rookie season with 45 punts for 2,028 net yards for a 45.07 average.

In the 2019 season, Bojorquez finished with 79 punts for 3,313 net yards for a 41.94 average. In the Wild Card Round of the playoffs against the Houston Texans, he was involved in an unusual sequence toward the end of the game. Bojorquez was normally the holder for the Bills on field goal attempts in 2019. The Bills did not know if they had a first down or if they were short with little time remaining. The spot of the ball was being reviewed by the booth. If the spot remained a fourth down, the Bills would be forced to attempt a field goal with time expiring. To counter this, Bills' head coach Sean McDermott sent the special teams onto the field during the review. After the review, the Bills had earned a first down and the clock restarted. Instead of losing valuable time to get the special teams off of the field, Bojorquez had to get under center and spike the ball to stop the clock.

In week 5 of the 2020 season against the Tennessee Titans, Bojorquez had a career-long 74-yard punt, breaking his previous career long set the previous week.

Los Angeles Rams
On April 20, 2021, Bojorquez signed with the Los Angeles Rams.

Green Bay Packers
On August 31, 2021, Bojorquez was traded to the Green Bay Packers along with a 2023 seventh-round draft pick in exchange for a 2023 sixth-round draft pick.

On October 17, 2021, Bojorquez had an 82-yard punt in the third quarter of a 24–14 victory over the Chicago Bears. The punt was a new career long for Bojorquez, the second-longest in Packers history, and the longest of the 2021 NFL season.

Cleveland Browns
On April 4, 2022, Bojorquez signed with the Cleveland Browns. He was named the starting punter in 2022, beating out Joseph Charlton. In Week 17, Bojorquez had four punts, two landing inside the 20-yard line with a long of 64 yards in a 24-10 win over the Washington Commanders, earning AFC Special Teams Player of the Week.

NFL career statistics

Regular season

Postseason

Personal life
Bojorquez is the oldest of four siblings, and is married to Diana Wong of Hilo, Hawaii. He is an ordained minister.

References

External links
Cleveland Browns bio
Cerritos College Falcons bio
New Mexico Lobos bio

1996 births
Living people
American football punters
Buffalo Bills players
Green Bay Packers players
Los Angeles Rams players
New England Patriots players
Cleveland Browns players
New Mexico Lobos football players
People from Bellflower, California
Players of American football from California
Sportspeople from Los Angeles County, California